Louis-Félix Chabaud (1824-1902) was a French sculptor, engraver and medallist.

Early life
Louis-Félix Chabaud was born on March 14, 1824, in Venelles, in the South of France.

Career
He designed many sculptures at the Palais Garnier in Paris. He won the Prix de Rome for engraving in 1848.

He designed the Saint Louis fountain in Aix-en-Provence. In 1860, he also designed one of the sculptures at the top of the Fontaine de la Rotonde in Aix.

He served as the Mayor of his hometown of Venelles from 1865 to 1870.

Death
He died on April 25, 1902, in Venelles.

Bibliography
Jean-Marc Héry, Louis-Félix Chabaud: paradoxes d'un sculpteur oublié, Paris: Editions Mare & Martin, 2011.

References

1824 births
1902 deaths
People from Bouches-du-Rhône
19th-century French sculptors
French male sculptors
French engravers
French medallists
Prix de Rome for engraving
Mayors of places in Provence-Alpes-Côte d'Azur
19th-century French male artists